The Baja pocket mouse (Chaetodipus rudinoris) is a species of rodent in the family Heteromyidae.  The species occurs in southern California, Baja California and on islands in the Gulf of California.

Subspecies
The Baia pocket mouse has six recognised subspecies. The Montserrat Island pocket mouse (Chaetodipus rudinoris fornicatus) became extinct in 1975 (last sighting).

Chaetodipus rudinoris rudinoris
Chaetodipus rudinoris extimus
Chaetodipus rudinoris fornicatus (Monserrate Island pocket mouse)†
Chaetodipus rudinoris hueyi
Chaetodipus rudinoris knekus
Chaetodipus rudinoris mesidios

References

Chaetodipus
Mammals described in 1903